Iván Moreno may refer to:
Iván Moreno (sprinter) (born 1942), Chilean sprinter
Iván Moreno (footballer) (born 1981), Spanish footballer
Iván Moreno (motorcyclist) (born 1989), Spanish motorcyclist
Estadio Iván Elías Moreno, Chilean multi-purpose stadium